Lycium europaeum, the European tea tree, European boxthorn, or European matrimonyvine, is a species of flowering plant in the family Solanaceae. It is native to the entire Mediterranean region, and has been introduced to the Canary Islands, Madeira, and the Balearic Islands. Its fruit is edible.

References

europaeum
Flora of North Africa
Flora of Southwestern Europe
Flora of Southeastern Europe
Flora of Western Asia
Plants described in 1753
Taxa named by Carl Linnaeus